Quantum Theatre is an experimental theatre company that uses non-traditional stages in Pittsburgh, PA. Founded in 1990 by Karla Boos, it is the longest running producer of site specific plays.

The theatre has been mentioned in American Theatre Magazine and Stage Directions Magazine.  It has staged classical plays, adaptations of literature, world premieres and contemporary plays in places such as Washington's Landing, Iron City Brewery, the former Don Allen Auto City, a Downtown loft in the Cultural District, abandoned school houses and the Frick Art & Historical Center.

Education
Quantum Theatre also features an educational outreach program in which a teaching artist helps students at inner-city high schools interpret a play, a piece of literature, or a historical event in contemporary terms.  The students then create a performance to be showcased at a rehearsal for a Quantum Theatre production.

On January 30, 2012, Quantum Theatre was one of twelve companies to participate in Organic Theater Pittsburgh's From the Ground Up event to promote collaborations between Pittsburgh playwrights and local theater troupes.

Productions
Quantum Theatre creates site-specific performances tailoring each one to the location. Updates can include costumes, plot, or a completely new adaptation. One example is when performing King Lear at the Carrie Furnace, Karla Boos mixed medieval English clothing with 1970s steelworker uniforms and added union songs to the play.

Quantum Theatre's final production of their 2018-2019 season will be the world premiere of Inside Passage, opening in March 2018. The play was written by Pittsburgh's Gab Cody, whose work was most recently featured in Bricolage Production Company's Dodo: The Time Has Come in partnership with the Carnegie Museums of Pittsburgh. Directed by Sam Turich, Inside Passage incorporates documentary film footage and live performance to explore themes of family, home, childhood, and loss.

See also
 Theatre in Pittsburgh

References

External links

Theatre
Performing arts
Culture of Pittsburgh
Performing arts in Pittsburgh
Theatre companies in Pittsburgh
Theatre in Pennsylvania
1990 establishments in Pennsylvania